The OK-GLI, also known as Buran Analog BTS-02, was a test vehicle ("Buran aerodynamic analogue") in the Buran programme. It was constructed in 1984, and was used for 25 test flights between 1985 and 1988 before being retired. It is now an exhibit at the Technik Museum Speyer in Germany.

Construction 
The development of the Buran began in the late 1970s as a response to the U.S. Space Shuttle program. The construction of the orbiters began in 1980, and by 1984 the first full-scale Buran was rolled out. The first suborbital test flight of a scale-model took place as early as July 1983. As the project progressed, five additional scale-model flights were performed.

The OK-GLI (Buran Analog BST-02) test vehicle ("Buran aerodynamic analogue") was constructed in 1984. It was fitted with four AL-31 jet engines mounted at the rear (the fuel tank for the engines occupied a quarter of the cargo bay). This Buran could take off under its own power for flight tests, in contrast to the American Enterprise test vehicle, which was entirely unpowered and relied on an air launch.

The jets were used to take off from a normal landing strip, and once it reached a designated point, the engines were cut and the OK-GLI glided back to land.  This provided invaluable information about the handling characteristics of the Buran design, and significantly differed from the carrier plane/air drop method used by the US and the Enterprise test craft.

Test flights 

Until the end of the Soviet Union in 1991, seven cosmonauts were allocated to the Buran programme. All had experience as test pilots and flew on the OK-GLI test vehicle. They were: Ivan Bachurin, Alexei Borodai, Anatoli Levchenko, Aleksandr Shchukin, Rimantas Stankevičius, Igor Volk and Viktor Zabolotsky.

In total, nine taxi tests and twenty-five test flights of the OK-GLI were performed, after which the vehicle was "worn out". All tests and flights were carried out at the Zhukovsky Air Base, outside Moscow.

Post-retirement

Zhukovsky Air Base 

After the program was cancelled, the OK-GLI was stored at Gromov Flight Research Institute, near Moscow, where it was displayed during the annual MAKS air show.

Sydney, Australia 
In 2000, the OK-GLI was sold to an Australian company called the Buran Space Corporation, owned by Australian astronaut Paul Scully-Power. It was disassembled and transported by ship to Sydney, Australia, via Gothenburg, Sweden; arriving on 9 February 2000 and appeared as a static tourist attraction under a large temporary structure in Darling Harbour for a few years.

Upon reassembly, the OK-GLI was put on display in a temporary enclosure for the 2000 Summer Olympics in Sydney. Visitors could walk around and inside the vehicle (a walkway was built along the cargo bay), and plans were in place for a tour of various cities in Australia and Asia. The owners went into bankruptcy after the Olympics, and the vehicle was moved into the open air and stored for a year in a fenced-in parking lot and protected by nothing more than a large tarpaulin, where it suffered deterioration and repeated vandalism.

Bahrain 

In September 2004 a team of German journalists found the OK-GLI in Bahrain, having been abandoned after it was on display as an attraction of the 2002 "Bahrain Summer" festival.

It was then bought by the Sinsheim Auto & Technik Museum, to be transported to Germany in 2005. Due to legal issues, it remained in Bahrain for several years, pending settlement of an international court case over fees.

Technik Museum Speyer, Germany 
On 4 March 2008 the OK-GLI began its journey by sea to the Technik Museum Speyer where it was refurbished and serves as a walk-in exhibit.

The journey got off to an inauspicious start when, during the transfer from the storage barge to the ship, there was a failure of the aft spreader (part of the lifting mechanism) and the tail of the vehicle dropped from just above deck height to the bottom of the hold. No one was hurt and both the ship and vehicle seemed to suffer only minor damage.

See also 

 Buran (spacecraft) – Buran spacecraft 1.01
 MAKS (spacecraft) - Soviet air-launched spaceplane concept
 Mikoyan-Gurevich MiG-105 – Soviet spaceplane test program
 Space Shuttle Enterprise - American Space Shuttle atmospheric test article
 Space Shuttle program - American spaceplane program
 Tupolev OOS - Soviet air-launched spaceplane concept

References

Further reading

External links 

 OK-GLI at Buran-Energia.com
 Buran Analogue entry at Encyclopedia Astronautica
 OK-GLI at K26.com
 OK-GLI at Technik Museum Speyer

Buran-class orbiters
Individual aircraft